Thái Thúc Thuần (March 28, 1925 – April 18, 2019) was a Vietnamese judoka who founded the Vietnamese Judo Federation in 1956. He was an Olympic competitor for the former Republic Of South Vietnam. He competed in the middleweight division. 

At the 1964 Summer Olympics, he lost to Peter Snijders and Pipat Sinhasema. He was listed in Black Belt Magazine as a participant within the 1964 Olympic games.

References

1927 births
2019 deaths
Olympic judoka of Vietnam
Judoka at the 1964 Summer Olympics
Vietnamese male judoka